Hangover House (also known as the Halliburton House) was designed and built by William Alexander for his friend the travel writer Richard Halliburton. Halliburton had first spotted the ridgetop site while riding on horseback on the beach in 1930. In 1937, Halliburton stated he had purchased a house in Laguna Beach, California. Constructed in 1938 on a hilltop, the house, boasting commanding views of the Pacific Ocean and Aliso Canyon, was built with three bedrooms, one each for Halliburton, Alexander, and Halliburton's lover Paul Mooney, who was also Halliburton's editor and ghostwriter. Halliburton reportedly spent  on the purchase of the site and construction of the house.

Design
Alexander drew upon European modern architecture and created flat-roofed boxes of concrete and glass. He hoped to create a house that, like the international modern spirit of Halliburton, soared above the clouds. Mies van der Rohe's work and his experimental concrete buildings of the 1920s, along with Le Corbusier's L'Esprit Nouveau Pavilion (1924–25) and his famous Villa Savoye (1928–29), influenced Alexander. Concrete and steel were the main materials used in its construction; the difficulty and expense of hauling materials and labor up the hill caused the construction cost to increase. Glass blocks formed part of the wall along the gallery that looked into a canyon several hundred feet below.  A huge bastionlike retaining wall outside the main building made the house appear safe from intrusion and Olympian in its detachment.

Alexander befriended Ayn Rand and provided quotes for her book The Fountainhead (1943). Rand's descriptions of the Heller House, and other houses designed by the book's hero Howard Roark, were believed, by Alexander, to be thinly disguised references to Hangover House.

The nickname "Hangover House" is a pun on both the building's location overlooking the cliffs, and the alcohol consumed there. Another source states that Halliburton named it after a cliff that he was saved from falling over while climbing the Matterhorn.

Owners
Halliburton and Mooney visited the construction site in May 1937; prior to starting the house, a road and retaining wall were built. Halliburton, Mooney, and the crew of the Chinese junk Sea Dragon were lost at sea in the Pacific Ocean during a typhoon in March 1939, shortly after the house was completed. Halliburton's parents announced plans to sell the house later that year and completed an auction in 1941, selling it to Gen. Wallace Thompson Scott and his wife Zolite for $9,000; the Scott family was the sole bidder. Zolite Scott lived in the house until her death in 2004; the title passed to Zolita Scott, Wallace's daughter and a locally prominent real estate agent, who died in November 2010.

Located at 31172 Ceanothus Drive, the house was then sold in December 2011 for $3.2 million. The buyer, a local resident, paid $2.4 million for the house and $800,000 for an adjacent lot. It was estimated it would take $500,000 to restore the house, as the rebar used in the ferroconcrete structure had rusted. As of April 2012, construction was underway to rehabilitate the building after much neglect had resulted in severe structural deterioration, although work was held up by preservationist disputes.

The City of Laguna Beach has determined the property is eligible for the National Register in its General Plan.

References

Further reading
Austen, Roger. Playing the Game: The Homosexual Novel in America. Bobbs-Merrill Co., 1977

External links

Houses in Orange County, California
Modernist architecture in California
Houses completed in 1938